Ian Dwight Bennett (born August 27, 1983) is a Canadian soccer player who plays for the Milwaukee Wave in the Major Arena Soccer League. He is the older brother of former Syracuse Silver Knights player Josh Bennett.

Career

College and amateur
Bennett attended St. Thomas More Catholic Secondary School, and played college soccer at Marian College from 2003 to 2006.

During his college years Bennett also played with the Hamilton Thunder in the Canadian Professional Soccer League; he joined the Thunder in 2001 and remained with the team through the 2005 season. In 2006, he spent the summer with the Palm Beach Pumas of the USL Premier Development League.

Professional
Bennett turned professional in 2007 when he signed with the Charleston Battery in the USL First Division. In the fall of 2007, Bennett signed with the Chicago Storm of the Major Indoor Soccer League.  In 2008, he moved to the Richmond Kickers of the USL Second Division. He returned to the Storm, in the Xtreme Soccer League for the 2008-2009 season and then when the Xtreme Soccer League folded, he joined the Milwaukee Wave in the MASL.

Bennett played with Rochester Rhinos in the 2010 season, then re-joined Milwaukee Wave starting in the 2010-11 MISL season, then transitioned with the Wave to the MASL, where he has won multiple personal honors and a Championship with the team.

With the Milwaukee Wave taking a hiatus for the 2020–21 MASL season, Bennett joined Florida Tropics SC on a season-long loan. The move reunited Bennett with former Wave teammates Drew Ruggles, Chad Vandegriffe, and Ricardinho Sobreira. Bennett was named MVP of the 2021 Major Arena Soccer League season.

Honors

Rochester Rhinos
USSF Division 2 Pro League Regular Season Champions (1): 2010

Milwaukee Wave
Major Indoor Soccer League - Champions (2): 2010-11, 2011–12
Major Arena Soccer League - Champions: 2018-19

Florida Tropics
Major Arena Soccer League - Regular Season Champions: 2021

Individual
MASL All Star: 2019-20
MASL MVP (2): 2021, 2021-22
All-MASL First Team (6): 2015-16, 2016–17, 2017–18, 2019-20, 2021, 2021-22
All-MASL Second Team: 2018-19

References

External links
 
 Chicago Power Player Profile

1983 births
Living people
Black Canadian soccer players
Canadian expatriate sportspeople in the United States
Canadian expatriate soccer players
Canadian sportspeople of Jamaican descent
Canadian sportspeople of Trinidad and Tobago descent
Canadian Soccer League (1998–present) players
Canadian soccer players
Charleston Battery players
Chicago Storm (MISL) players
Chicago Storm (XSL) players
Expatriate soccer players in the United States
Association football midfielders
Hamilton Thunder players
Major Indoor Soccer League (2001–2008) players
Palm Beach Pumas players
Soccer players from Hamilton, Ontario
Richmond Kickers players
Rochester New York FC players
USSF Division 2 Professional League players
USL First Division players
USL League Two players
USL Second Division players
Xtreme Soccer League players
Milwaukee Wave players
Major Indoor Soccer League (2008–2014) players
Major Arena Soccer League players
Canadian men's futsal players
Canadian beach soccer players
Florida Tropics SC players